Lafayette Towers Apartments East (1301 Orleans Street, Detroit, Michigan) is one of two identical apartment buildings designed by Mies van der Rohe. The other is Lafayette Towers Apartments West.

The apartment is in the Lafayette Park development, near downtown. Both were built in 1963 and stand at 22 stories in height. They were designed in the International style of architecture, much like the Lafayette Pavilion Apartments, and the other buildings in the development.

Lafayette Park development
Along with the other neighboring Mies van der Rohe-designed buildings, this building was added to the National Register of Historic Places in 1996.

This is one of four towers in the Lafayette Park development. The others are the Windsor Tower, the Lafayette Pavilion Apartments, and the Lafayette Towers Apartments West.

External links
 Google Maps location of the Lafayette Towers Apartments. Tower West is to the left, while Tower East is to the right.
 
 

Apartment buildings in Detroit
Ludwig Mies van der Rohe buildings
Residential skyscrapers in Detroit
1960s architecture in the United States
International style architecture in Michigan
Modernist architecture in Michigan